Mitiku Belachew (11 June 1942 – 7 April 2021) was an Ethiopian-born Belgian surgeon. He was known for inventing the adjustable gastric band and aiding in the fight against obesity.

Biography
Mitiku Belachew was born on 11 June 1942 in Wonchi to a family of nine children. As a child, he experienced the death of his brother and moved to Addis Ababa at the age of twelve. There, he studied medicine, and his abilities allowed him to surpass many of his peers. He said "I was penniless, so I went with the nerve: I asked a British couple to finance my studies in exchange for housework". In 1962, he began studying at Addis Ababa University before receiving a scholarship to study medicine at the University of Liège in Belgium, although he did not speak French. He graduated in 1970.

Mitiku Belachew worked as a surgeon in Liège when an obese nurse asked him to show her how to lose weight. He had performed many "bowel short-circuit" surgeries in the past but was dissatisfied with them, saying "I stopped everything when I lost my first patient because of complications related to the lack of follow-up". Therefore, he invented the adjustable gastric band positioned between the esophagus and the stomach. He performed the first successful surgery of the sort on 1 September 1993 using a laparoscopic camera. However, he refused to file a patent on the device, saying "I don't like this mercantile side of surgery".

Mitiku Belachew died on 7 April 2021 at the age of 78.

Awards

Publications
Histoire de l’anneau modulable laparoscopique (LAGB), du rêve à la réalité (2001)
Le berger devenu chirurgien. Des hauts plateaux d'Ethiopie aux blocs opératoires (2015), Publisher : Persée

References

1942 births
2021 deaths
Belgian surgeons
Ethiopian surgeons
Ethiopian emigrants to Belgium
Addis Ababa University alumni
University of Liège alumni
People from Oromia Region